Xylotrechus a genus of longhorned beetles of the family Cerambycidae, containing some 200 described species.

Selected species
Some of the species in the genus include:
 Xylotrechus aceris Fisher, 1917
 Xylotrechus aedon Jordan, 1903
 Xylotrechus albonotatus Casey, 1912
 Xylotrechus annobonae Aurivillius, 1910
 Xylotrechus annosus (Say, 1826)
 Xylotrechus bowditchi Hopping, 1928
 Xylotrechus colonus (Fabricius, 1775)
 Xylotrechus convergens LeConte, 1873
 Xylotrechus durangoensis Chemsak & Linsley, 1974
 Xylotrechus gemellus Casey, 1893 (Presumed extinct)
 Xylotrechus hovorei Swift, 2007
 Xylotrechus insignis LeConte, 1873
 Xylotrechus integer (Haldeman, 1847)
 Xylotrechus lengi Schaeffer, 1908
 Xylotrechus longitarsis Casey, 1912
 Xylotrechus mormonus (LeConte, 1861)
 Xylotrechus nauticus (Mannerheim, 1843)
 Xylotrechus nitidus (Horn, 1860)
 Xylotrechus nunenmacheri Van Dyke, 1920
 Xylotrechus obliteratus LeConte, 1873
 Xylotrechus pyrrhoderus  Bates, 1873
 Xylotrechus quadrimaculatus (Haldeman, 1847)
 Xylotrechus quadripes Chevrolat, 1863
 Xylotrechus quercus Schaeffer, 1905
 Xylotrechus robustus Hopping, 1941
 Xylotrechus rusticus (Linnaeus, 1758)
 Xylotrechus sagittatus (Germar, 1821)
 Xylotrechus sartorii (Chevrolat, 1860)
 Xylotrechus schaefferi Schott, 1925
 Xylotrechus undulatus (Say, 1824)

References

External links
 BioLib - Xylotrechus
 zipcodezoo.com - Xylotrechus (Genus)

 
Clytini